Sendlein is a surname. Notable people with the surname include:

Lyle Sendlein (born 1984), American football player
Robin Sendlein (born 1958), American football player and fire fighter